Alexander Zuntz (May 15, 1742 – October 15, 1819) was a Hessian Jew who was a noted figure in the early American Jewish community and was one of the founders of the Bank of New York in 1784 and the New York Stock Exchange.

Early life
He was born May 15, 1742 in Westphalia, Germany.

Zuntz came to America in 1779 during the Revolutionary War with the British army. He was a civilian commissary, army supplier, and adjutant of the Hessian mercenary forces, that were employed by England's King George III, who was a German himself, to fight the revolutionaries.

Jewish community 
Zuntz played an important role in saving the Congregation Shearith Israel, founded in 1654 as the first Jewish congregation in America, by persuading the military leaders to not use the sanctuary as a hospital. During the time the British controlled New York, Zuntz replaced Gershon Mendes Seixas as hazzan in the Shearith Israel Congregation, because like many Hessian and British Jews, Zuntz, in contrast to Seixas, preferred to stay in America and not go back to Europe.

Zuntz remained involved in the Jewish community and after he became treasurer, he took over the presidency of the Shearith Israel Congregation from Lyon Jonas.

Career
Zuntz worked as a merchant and was one of the founders of the Bank of New York in 1784 and the New York Stock Exchange. In 1785, he had to post his insolvency because of the economic crisis in the United States, caused by the British by flooding New York with manufacturers. However, in 1797, he finally became successful as a broker and money lender.

Death
He died October 15, 1819 in New York.

References 
Hirschfeld, Fritz. “George Washington and the Jews.” University of Delaware Press, 2005.

Phillips, N. Taylor “The Congregation Shearith Israel. An Historical Review.” Publications of the American Jewish Historical Society, no. 6, 1897, pp. 123–140. JSTOR, www.jstor.org/stable/43058644.

Phillips, Rosalie S. “American Jewish Historical Quarterly, Band 18.” American Jewish Historical Society, 1909.

Sarna, Jonathan D. “The Impact of the American Revolution on American Jews.” Modern Judaism, vol. 1, no. 2, 1981, pp. 149–160. JSTOR. www.jstor.org/stable/1396058.

Kohler, Max J. “The German-Jewish Migration to America.” Publications of the American Jewish Historical Society, no. 9, 1901, pp. 87–105. JSTOR, www.jstor.org/stable/43058848.

“Alexander Zuntz”. Find A Grave, findagrave.com. 9 Jul. 2017.

Rock, Howard B. "Haven of Liberty: New York Jews in the New World, 1654-1865, Volume 1." NYU Press, 08.01.2015.

Reiss, Oscar. “The Jews in Colonial America.” McFarland, 02.01.2004.

"Zuntz, Alexander". Encyclopaedia Judaica, Encyclopedia.com. 9 Jul. 2017.

1742 births
1819 deaths
18th-century German Jews
Hessian military personnel of the American Revolutionary War
People from former German states in North Rhine-Westphalia
German emigrants to the United States
Hazzans
American bankers
Jewish-American history